Ectodus descampsii is a species of cichlid fish endemic to Lake Tanganyika in East Africa where it prefers areas with substrates of coarse sand.  It feeds on micro-organisms, algae and diatoms.  This species reaches a length of  TL.  It is also found in the aquarium trade.  It is currently the only known member of its genus. The specific name honours Capitaine Georges Descamps (1855-1938), a Belgian officer in the anti-slavery movement at Lake Tanganyika.

References

Ectodini
Cichlid fish of Africa
Fish of Lake Tanganyika
Taxa named by George Albert Boulenger
Monotypic ray-finned fish genera
Taxobox binomials not recognized by IUCN